Abdirisaq Waberi Roble is a Somali politician, He previously served as the Minister of Youth and Sports of Somaliland, from December 2016 to December 2017.

See also

 Politics of Somaliland
 Ministry of Youth and Sports (Somaliland)
 Cabinet of Somaliland

References

Living people
Government ministers of Somaliland
Youth and Sports ministers of Somaliland
Somaliland politicians
Year of birth missing (living people)